Karabulak is a rural locality (a settlement) in Ikryaninsky Selsoviet, Ikryaninsky District, Astrakhan Oblast, Russia. The population was 275 as of 2010. There are 3 streets.

Geography 
Karabulak is located 18 km west of Ikryanoye (the district's administrative centre) by road. Sergino is the nearest rural locality.

References 

Rural localities in Ikryaninsky District